London Gateway services is the southernmost motorway service station on the M1 motorway – between Junctions 2 and 4 – north of London, England. It is between Arkley and Edgware on the west side of the road, has a hotel, and, unusually, has an early give way on its northern approach.

History
It opened in 1969, run by Forte, and was opened as Scratchwood Services. Its main approaches are those built for an abortive junction 3 of the M1 for a spur (as at junction 2) to link to the A1.

On 6 September 1997, many people parked at the service station to witness the passing of the funeral hearse of Diana, Princess of Wales on its way along with the M1 from central London to her burial place in Althorp, Northamptonshire.

A reserved section of the current service area is a major long-distance coach service interchange.

Planning has been permitted for a Tesla Supercharger consisting of 32 stalls to be built at the site  was granted on 18 May 2018, – yet to open.

The guns in both forward turrets on the museum ship , moored between Tower Bridge and London Bridge some 11.7 miles away in the centre of London, are elevated and trained on the London Gateway Motorway Services Area.

Layout
It has a separate, first, northbound approach, targeted at its hotel part, the roads of which are linked to the rest of the complex.

The entry and exit spur for the motorway's southbound carriageway cross (to and from) the services at a high point on the west side.  The service station has an unusual give way for the entry spur mentioned (vehicles coming from the north must give way).

To far south is a linked, controlled access, emergency vehicle road to/from Ellesmere Avenue.

References

External links
Official Site - London Gateway
Motorway Services Online - London Gateway
Motorway Services Trivia Website - Scratchwood services (now London Gateway)

1969 establishments in England
M1 motorway service stations
Welcome Break motorway service stations
Buildings and structures in the London Borough of Barnet